Holy Cross High School is a Roman Catholic school in Camp Phillips, Bukidnon province in the north of Mindanao, Philippines. It was founded in 1950 and has been run by different branches of the Religious Sisters of Mercy.

History 
The school was founded in 1950 by Father Rodolfo Cabonce, S.J. with the assistance of Philippine Packing Corporation in obtaining the site and constructing the school. Initially, there was 54 first year students and 23 second year students taught by three teachers: Fathers Rodolfo Cabonce, Rafael Ocampo and Luis Meciano, all Jesuit priests, who also became members of the 1st Board of Trustees.

During the succeeding 27 years of existence, the HCHS saw several changes in its administration and physical structure. A new wing was added to the original L-structure. More classrooms were constructed to accommodate a growing number of students.

In 1960, the Sisters of St. Joseph of Newark, New Jersey took over the administration of the school. In 1973, the Religious Sisters of Mercy of Buffalo, New York were tasked to run the institution. It was during their term that the Guidance Program was introduced and the parents organized the Parents Auxiliary Council (PAC) which was later renamed PTA or Parents-Teachers Association. In 1975, the school experienced team administration. A revised secondary curriculum was implemented. The PPC-HCHS Industrial Arts program composed of Agriculture, Woodworking, Metal and Electricity was offered.

In 1977, the responsibility of running the school was delegated to the Religious Sisters of Mercy of Cork, Ireland.

References 

Holy Cross High School Student's Handbook

External links 
Official site

Catholic secondary schools in the Philippines
High schools in the Philippines
Educational institutions established in 1950
Schools in Bukidnon
1950 establishments in the Philippines